"William" is a song by English indie rock band The Others and is featured on their debut album, The Others. Released on 4 April 2005, it was the fourth single from the album and charted at number 29.

Track listing
 "William"  
 "This Is for the Poor"  
 "William"  
 "Psychovision" 
 "William"  
 "Stan Bowles"  
 "Community 853"

2004 singles
The Others (band) songs
2004 songs
Mercury Records singles
Song articles with missing songwriters